First Secretary may refer to:
 First minister, a leader of a government
 Secretary (title), a leader of a political party (especially Communist parties), trade union, or other organization
 First Secretary (diplomatic rank), a role within an embassy
 First Secretary of State, a ministerial rank in the British government